North Riding of Yorkshire was the constituency of the North Riding of Yorkshire.  It returned two Members of Parliament to the House of Commons of the Parliament of the United Kingdom.

The constituency was created by the Reform Act 1832, when the four-seat Yorkshire constituency was divided in three for the 1832 general election.  It was abolished by the Redistribution of Seats Act 1885, and replaced for the 1885 general election by the new single-member constituencies of Cleveland, Richmond, Thirsk & Malton and Whitby, most its remaining small boroughs seeing disenfranchisement in 1868 or in 1885.

Members of Parliament

MPs 1654–1658 (Protectorate Parliaments)

MPs 1832–1885

Election results

Elections in the 1830s

Elections in the 1840s

 

Duncombe succeeded to the peerage, becoming 2nd Baron Feversham and causing a by-election.

Elections in the 1850s

Elections in the 1860s
Cayley's death caused a by-election.

 

Duncombe was elevated to the peerage, becoming 1st Lord Feversham, and causing a by-election.

Elections in the 1870s

Elections in the 1880s

Duncombe's death caused a by-election.

References 

Parliamentary constituencies in Yorkshire and the Humber (historic)
Constituencies of the Parliament of the United Kingdom established in 1832
Constituencies of the Parliament of the United Kingdom disestablished in 1885
North Riding of Yorkshire
Parliamentary constituencies in North East England (historic)